Golmud railway station, Geermu railway station or Ge'ermu railway station is the main railway station of Golmud in Qinghai (China). The station is located at 2829 m above sea level and opened in 1979.

This is an intermediate station on the Qinghai–Tibet railway and the eastern terminus of the Golmud–Korla railway.

History 
Golmud railway station was rebuilt and expanded as part of the Golmud–Korla railway project. The new station was opened on 30 June 2020.

References 

Stations on the Qinghai–Tibet Railway
Railway stations in Qinghai
Railway stations in China opened in 1979